Postkodmiljonären (English translation: The postcode millionaire)  is a Swedish game show based on the original British format of Who Wants to Be a Millionaire?. The show debuted on 26 August 2005 and is hosted by Rickard Sjöberg. It is shown every Friday and Saturday from 7:30 PM to 8 PM (UTC+1) on the Swedish commercial television station TV4. The programme is also combined with a lottery, Svenska Postkodlotteriet (The Swedish Postcode Lottery), in a twice-weekly format. The original format of the show, broadcast between 2000 and 2003, was known as Vem vill bli miljonär? and lacked the lottery tie-in.

The main goal of the game is to win 1 million SEK by answering 15 multiple-choice questions correctly. The more questions the contestant answers correctly, the more money the contestant passively earns. There are a number of lifelines which the participant can use to help them on their journey. There are "guaranteed levels" which guarantee the participant to walk away with a certain amount of money. The participant also has the option of refusing to answer a question and thus walk away with the money the participant has most recently passively or certainly earned. The game ends as soon as the participant either answers a question incorrectly, decides to walk away, or answers the million-SEK question.

Format 
The game contains 15 levels, each of which consists of one question. There are three guaranteed levels: 10,000 SEK, 100,000 SEK, and 1,000,000 (1 million) SEK. The contestant begins by deciding whether or not to include the Switch the Question lifeline; if the lifeline is included, the 100,000 SEK level will not be a guaranteed level. The game then begins. Each question has four possible answers. There are three–four lifelines which can be used by the contestant on any question: Fifty Fifty (50:50 – femtio-femtio), Phone A Friend (ringa en vän), Ask The Audience (fråga publiken), and Switch the Question (byta fråga). Fifty Fifty takes randomly away two of the possible wrong answers, leaving the contestant with only two alternatives. Phone A Friend lets the contestant call a friend to help the contestant with the question. During Phone A Friend, the contestant and the called person have 30 seconds, during which the contestant usually delivers the question and then the called person gives their advice. Ask The Audience asks every person in the studio audience to give their answer to the question, after which the percentage results of each possible answer is displayed. Switch the Question swaps the question for a new one while forcing the contestant to pick an answer to find out the correct answer to the initial question. Each lifeline can only be used once during the course of the entire game. Multiple lifelines can be used on the same question.

Every time the contestant answers a question correctly, the contestant moves one step up in the money tree. If the participant answers the million-SEK question correctly, the game ends and the participant wins the top prize of 1 million SEK and is declared a millionaire. If the contestant wrongly answers a question, the right answer is revealed, the game ends and the contestant walks away with the money value of the most recently cleared guaranteed level. This implies that if the contestant loses before clearing the 10,000 SEK guaranteed level, the contestant walks away empty-handed. If the contestant decides not to answer the question, the game ends and the contestant walks away with the money value of the most recently cleared level and is asked to pick an answer to find out the correct answer to the question. This implies that if the contestant walks away before clearing the first question, the contestant walks away empty-handed.

Occasionally, special episodes are aired where the show invites pairs of Swedish celebrities who play together. However, these pairs don't get to keep their earnings; instead, they are donated to a charitable organization which is chosen by the pair.

Payout structure 

*: Only a guaranteed level if the contestant chooses not to get the Switch the Question lifeline.

Winners 
As of 5 February 2023, there have been 13 top-prize winners (one was a pair) in Postkodmiljonären: Per Hörberg, Torgny Segerstedt, Olle Laurell, Jan Sundström, Mattias Österman, Lena Anviken, Birgitta Hedström, the pair Lena Ag and Alexandra Pascalidou, Ylva Orrmell, Marianne Hiller, Ulf Jensen, Eric Forsyth and Jonas von Essen. Forsyth is the youngest winner at 29 years' age. Lena Anviken was the first woman to win the million, and the sixth overall. Overall, there have been eight male winners, four female winners and one pair winner.

This was Jonas von Essen's one million SEK question:

This was Eric Forsyth's one million SEK question:

This was Ulf Jensen's one million SEK question:

This was Marianne Hiller's one million SEK question:

This was Ylva Orrmell's one million SEK question:

This was the pair Lena Ag and Alexandra Pascalidou's one million SEK question:

This was Birgitta Hedström's one million SEK question:

This was Lena Anviken's one million SEK question:

This was Mattias Österman's one million SEK question:

This was Jan Sundström's second one million SEK question (after using Switch the Question):

This was Olle Laurell's one million SEK question:

This was Torgny Segerstedt's one million SEK question:

This was Per Hörberg's one million SEK question:

External links

References

Who Wants to Be a Millionaire?
TV4 (Sweden) original programming
Swedish game shows
2005 Swedish television series debuts